Luis Pérez Romero (born 25 December 1980) is a former Spanish cyclist.

Palmares
2006
1st Stage 2 Volta a Catalunya
1st Overall Vuelta a Chihuahua
1st Stages 2 & 4

References

1980 births
Living people
Spanish male cyclists
Cyclists from Madrid